Louis Le Gros (31 December 1893 in Gorée, Senegal – 10 September 1969 in Nice, France) was a politician from Senegal who served in the French Senate from 1952–1958.

References 
 page on the French Senate website

Senegalese politicians
French Senators of the Fourth Republic
1893 births
1969 deaths
Senators of French West Africa
Senegalese emigrants to France